Neirone is a comune (municipality) in the Metropolitan City of Genoa in the Italian region Liguria, located about  east of Genoa.  
 
Neirone borders the following municipalities: Favale di Malvaro, Lorsica, Lumarzo, Mocònesi, Torriglia, Tribogna, Uscio.

References

Cities and towns in Liguria